Scott Road is an elevated station on the Expo Line of Metro Vancouver's SkyTrain rapid transit system. The station is located near the south end of the Pattullo Bridge in the South Westminster neighbourhood of Surrey, British Columbia, Canada. It also serves the Bridgeview neighbourhood of Whalley, and the interchange between King George Boulevard and Scott Road is located to the north of the station. The station opened on March 16, 1990, and was renovated from 2013 to 2014.

History
Scott Road station opened on March 16, 1990 as part of the first extension of the original SkyTrain system (now known as the Expo Line). This extension included two stations—Scott Road and Columbia in neighbouring New Westminster—as well as the SkyBridge over the Fraser River. Scott Road station served as the eastern terminus of the Expo Line until a three-station extension to Surrey City Centre was completed in 1994.

Scott Road station underwent several upgrades beginning in early 2013, improvements included a new elevator and better accessibly, as well as a new bus loop with an upgraded parking lot. These improvements were made in part of the larger Expo Line Upgrade project. Construction was completed in 2014.

Services 
Scott Road station is located in an industrial district, but it is an important transfer point for TransLink passengers.

Station information

Station layout

Entrances
Scott Road station is served by five entrances. Two entrances are located on the east side of Scott Road and provide access to Lot A of the Park and Ride. The remaining three entrances are located on the west side of Scott Road providing access to bus exchange and to Lot B of the Park and Ride.

Transit connections

Scott Road station is a major connection point for TransLink bus routes that service Surrey, North Delta, and Ladner.

Bus bay assignments are as follows:

Notes

References

Expo Line (SkyTrain) stations
Railway stations in Canada opened in 1990
Buildings and structures in Surrey, British Columbia
Transport in Surrey, British Columbia
1990 establishments in British Columbia